T in the Park 2013 was a three-day  music festival which took place between 11–14 July 2013 in Balado, Kinross. It was the 20th Anniversary #T20 of the Scottish music festival Rihanna and Mumford and Sons were announced as the first and second headliner acts on 4 December 2012. Others acts confirmed on the same day were Jake Bugg, Alt-J, Of Monsters and Men, The Script, Paloma Faith. On 5 December 2012 The Killers were announced as third headliner act and other acts confirmed were Two Door Cinema Club and Azealia Banks. On 13 December 2012 it was announced that Emeli Sandé would return to the music festival for its 20th anniversary. On 13 February 2013, Germany Electronic band Kraftwerk were added to the line-up.

Tickets
Similar to previous years, early-bird tickets were released within days of the conclusion of the 2012 event, on 13 July 2012. Tickets remained on sale until the following Sunday. The second release of tickets went on sale at 9am on 7 December 2012. The third and final batch went on sale in February, 2013 along with the release of the Line-up.

Line-up
The Killers, Rihanna and Mumford and Sons were announced as headliner acts for 2013 festival. Other acts announced were: Emeli Sandé, Jake Bugg, Alt-J, Of Monsters and Men, The Script, Paloma Faith, Two Door Cinema Club and Azealia Banks. On 13 February 2013, Germany Electronic band Kraftwerk were added to the line-up. On 22 April 2013, Ke$ha, Little Mix, Lawson, James Arthur, Lucy Spraggan, Bo Bruce and Diana Vickers were added to the line-up.

Scottish Sun Signing Tent

Incidents
The number of arrests rose to 91, which was a sharp increase from 2012 where only 30 were made, with the most serious offence being five people arrested and charged with using pyrotechnic flares.

Advance warning was given to all festival-goers about a deadly batch of fake ecstasy pills which were linked to the deaths of 17 people between April and July 2013.

Police Supt Rick Dunkerley, said: ''While arrests are up on last year, this is due to the proactive efforts of our police officers who worked closely with stewards to ensure it was a safe and enjoyable event for the audience. The fact that there were no signs of the fake ecstasy tablets at the event is in part testament to the extensive pre-event messaging and work carried out in collaboration with the festival organisers".

See also
T in the Park 2014
T in the Park 2012
T in the Park 2011
T in the Park 2010
List of music festivals in the United Kingdom

References

External links

T in the Park
2013 in Scotland
2013 in British music
July 2013 events in the United Kingdom
2013 music festivals